Kannur North is a suburb of Kannur city in the state of Kerala, India.

Commercial Area
Kannur North is a busy commercial area of Kannur city.  Many transport companies and wholesale dealers have opened their offices here.  Marble merchants and other heavy duty shops are also common here. National Highway 66 passes through Kannur North.

Suburbs and townships
 Pallikunnu. 26,963 people
 Chirakkal. 43,290 people
 Puzhathi. 33,470 people
 Azhikode. 42,354 people
 Valapattanam 8,920 people
 Pappinisseri. 35,134 people

Important landmarks
 Government Women's College, Kannur
 Central Prison, Podikkundu, The Kannur Central Prison is situated at Pallikkunnu, on the Kannur-Kasaragod Highway.
 Akashvani, Prasar Bharati

Location

References

Suburbs of Kannur